Andrew William D'Souza (born 1 July 1994) is a Canadian male badminton player from Ottawa, Ontario. He has been a top ranked men's individual on the continent and a contender in major international competitions such as the 2012 BWF World Junior Championships, the 2014 Commonwealth Games and 2015 Pan American Games. He has won the men's singles title at the Canadian National Badminton Championships in 2015. In 2011, he trained at the Gopichand Badminton Academy in India.

Achievements

Pan American Games 

Men's Singles

BWF International Challenge/Series
Men's Doubles

 BWF International Challenge tournament
 BWF International Series tournament

References

External links 
 Official website
 
 
 Toronto 2015

Living people
1994 births
Sportspeople from Ottawa
Canadian male badminton players
Badminton players at the 2014 Commonwealth Games
Commonwealth Games competitors for Canada
Badminton players at the 2015 Pan American Games
Pan American Games silver medalists for Canada
Pan American Games medalists in badminton
Medalists at the 2015 Pan American Games